Xiangtan County  is a county in Hunan Province, China; it is under the administration of Xiangtan City. Located on the east central Hunan, the county is bordered to the north by Yuhu, Yuetang Districts and Xiangtan City, to the west by Xiangxiang City and Shuangfeng County, to the south by Hengshan and Hengdong Counties, to the east by Zhuzhou County and Tianyuan District of Zhuzhou City. The county has 14 towns and 3 townships under its jurisdiction, the county seat is at Yisuhe Town.

Administrative divisions
After an adjustment of subdistrict divisions of Xiangtan County on 19 November 2015, Xiangtan County has 14 towns and 3 townships under its jurisdiction. they are:

References

www.xzqh.org 

 
County-level divisions of Xiangtan